The 1999 First-Year Player Draft, Major League Baseball's annual amateur draft of high school and college baseball players, was held on June 2 and 3, 1999. A total of 1474 players were drafted over the course of 50 rounds.

First round selections

Supplemental first round selections

Compensation picks

Other notable players 

Carl Crawford, 2nd round, 52nd overall by the Tampa Bay Devil Rays (All-Star)
Brandon Phillips, 2nd round, 57th overall by the Montreal Expos (All-Star)
Ryan Doumit, 2nd round, 59th overall by the Pittsburgh Pirates
Ryan Ludwick, 2nd round, 60th overall by the Oakland Athletics (All-Star)
John Lackey, 2nd round, 68th overall by the Anaheim Angels (All-Star)
Jack Taschner, 2nd round, 75th overall by the San Francisco Giants
Justin Morneau, 3rd round, 89th overall by the Minnesota Twins (All-Star)
Willie Bloomquist, 3rd round, 95th overall by the Seattle Mariners
Jon Rauch, 3rd round, 99th overall by the Chicago White Sox
Josh Bard, 3rd round, 100th overall by the Colorado Rockies
Hank Blalock, 3rd round, 105th overall by the Texas Rangers (All-Star)
Cody Ross, 4th round, 117th overall by the Detroit Tigers
Kevin Mench, 4th round, 118th overall by the Texas Rangers
Ángel Pagán, 4th round, 136th overall by the New York Mets
Alec Zumwalt, 4th round, 144th overall by the Atlanta Braves
Nate Robertson, 5th round, 146th overall by the Florida Marlins
Joe Saunders, 5th round, 156th overall by the Philadelphia Phillies, but did not sign (All-Star)
J. J. Putz, 6th round, 185th overall by the Seattle Mariners (All-Star)
Érik Bédard, 6th round, 187th overall by the Baltimore Orioles
Shane Victorino, 6th round, 194th overall by the Los Angeles Dodgers (All-Star)
Aaron Harang, 6th round, 195th overall by the Texas Rangers 
Coco Crisp, 7th round, 222nd overall by the St. Louis Cardinals
Chris Capuano, 8th round, 238th overall by the Arizona Diamondbacks (All-Star)
Mark Ellis, 9th round, 271st overall by the Kansas City Royals
Marlon Byrd, 10th round, 306th overall by the Philadelphia Phillies (All-Star)
Matt Guerrier, 10th round, 309th overall by the Chicago White Sox
Greg Dobbs, 10th round, 323rd overall by the Houston Astros, but did not sign
Lew Ford, 12th round, 379th overall by the Boston Red Sox
Albert Pujols, 13th round, 402nd overall by the St. Louis Cardinals (All-Star)
Brandon Lyon, 14th round, 433rd overall by the Toronto Blue Jays
Garrett Jones, 14th round, 444th overall by the Atlanta Braves
Jake Peavy, 15th round, 472nd overall by the San Diego Padres (All-Star)
Matt Diaz, 17th round, 505th overall by the Tampa Bay Devil Rays
Reed Johnson, 17th round, 523rd overall by the Toronto Blue Jays
Ryan Raburn, 18th round, 535th overall by the Tampa Bay Devil Rays, but did not sign
Lyle Overbay, 18th round, 538th overall by the Arizona Diamondbacks
Scott Hairston, 18th round, 549th overall by the Chicago White Sox, but did not sign
Noah Lowry, 19th round, 585th overall by the Texas Rangers, but did not sign
Willie Harris, 24th round, 727th overall by the Baltimore Orioles
Jason Frasor, 33rd round, 1145th overall by the Detroit Tigers
Rich Harden, 38th round, 987th overall by the Seattle Mariners, but did not sign
Mike Jacobs, 38th round, 1156th overall by the New York Mets
Kameron Loe, 39th round, 1176th overall by the Philadelphia Phillies, but did not sign
Adam LaRoche, 42nd round, 1254th overall by the Florida Marlins, but did not sign
Chris Snyder, 43rd round, 1290th overall by the Seattle Mariners, but did not sign
Pat Neshek, 45th round, 1337th overall by the Minnesota Twins, but did not sign

NFL players drafted 
Michael Bishop, 44th round, 1328th overall by the Cleveland Indians, but did not sign

See also
Major League Baseball
Major League Baseball Draft
List of MLB first overall draft choices
Rule 5 Draft

External links
Complete draft list from The Baseball Cube database
MLB.com's section on the draft

Major League Baseball draft
Draft
Major League Baseball draft